Fulvio Cecere (born March 11, 1960) is a Canadian actor and filmmaker.

Early life
Born in Canada, he moved to Hawthorne, New Jersey, as a teenager and attended Hawthorne High School, graduating as part of the class of 1978. Cecere attended Southwestern Law School in Los Angeles, but after one year he realized that acting, not law, was his true calling. He took acting classes at UCLA and starred in a wide array of television and feature film parts over the next few years.

Career
He played the part of freelance detective Fred Durkin in the A&E Network's original film The Golden Spiders: A Nero Wolfe Mystery (2000) and the series A Nero Wolfe Mystery (2001–2002). He also starred as Det. Leon Vaughn in the 2001 slasher film Valentine. He also portrayed Lt. Thorne in Battlestar Galactica, Agent Sandoval in Dark Angel (2000–2002), and had recurring roles in TV series including Tarzan, Tilt, Blade and Intelligence. His work in feature films includes roles in Paycheck, Assault on Precinct 13, Cinderella Man, The Tortured and Watchmen.

Cecere's 2018 documentary film 350 Days includes interviews with 70 current and former professional wrestlers. The film, whose title references the number of days many wrestlers spend working each year, took five years to complete and resulted from an interest in wrestling that arose out of Cecere's work on Cinderella Man.

Filmography

 1995 Dangerous Intentions as Officer Tuggles
 1995 Assassins as Cop #5
 1996 Unforgettable as Partner (uncredited)
 1997 Excess Baggage as Sharp Shooter
 1998 Dirty as Larry
 1998 Disturbing Behavior as Anesthesiologist (uncredited)
 1998 Letters from a Killer as Angry Man
 1998 American Dragons as Bobby Spano
 1998 Delivered as Detective #1
 1998 The Bone Collector as Forensics Expert
 1999 The Hurricane as Paterson Policeman
 1999 Double Jeopardy as BMW Salesman
 2000 Mercy as Detective Leeland
 2000 Best in Show as Airport Passerby
 2001 Valentine as Detective Leon Vaughn
 2001 See Spot Run as Lawyer
 2001 Replicant as Agent #1
 2002 Liberty Stands Still as Officer Burt McGovern
 2003 The Invitation as Correlli (scenes deleted)
 2003 Paycheck as Agent Fuman
 2004 The Perfect Score as Francesca's Father
 2005 Assault on Precinct 13 as Officer Ray Portnell
 2005 Cinderella Man as Referee McAvoy
 2005 Chaos as Detective Thomas Branch
 2006 John Tucker Must Die as Chemistry Teacher
 2006 Deck the Halls as Town Passerby
 2007 No Reservations as Bob, Fish Vendor
 2008 Girlfriend Experience as Police Officer
 2009 Watchmen as Agent Forbes
 2009 Case 39 as Fire Marshall
 2010 The Tortured as Detective Berger
 2010 Resident Evil: Afterlife as Wendell
 2011 Matty Hanson and the Invisibility Ray as FBI Agent
 2011 High Chicago as 'Popeye'
 2014 Step Up: All In as Uncle (Pizza Place)
 2015 The Age of Adaline as Cab Driver
 2015 The Unspoken as Sheriff

References

External links
 
 

1960 births
20th-century Canadian male actors
21st-century Canadian male actors
Male actors from New Jersey
Canadian expatriate male actors in the United States
Canadian male film actors
Canadian people of Italian descent
Canadian male television actors
Canadian male voice actors
Living people
People from Hawthorne, New Jersey
Place of birth missing (living people)
Southwestern Law School alumni
UCLA Film School alumni